The 2022 Pacific Mini Games was held in Saipan, Northern Mariana Islands. It was the eleventh edition of the Pacific Mini Games and the first to be hosted by the Commonwealth of Northern Mariana Islands.

Host selection
The Northern Mariana Islands were awarded the rights to host the games on July 4, 2014 during the Pacific Games Councils General Assembly meeting in Port Moresby, Papua New Guinea. The decision was unanimous after the CNMI were the only bidder after the deadline.

Venues and infrastructure

Sports
An initial twelve sports were scheduled for the games but this was reduced to six in 2019, following the impact of Typhoon Yutu. The program was later increased to nine sports with the inclusion of va'a (outrigger canoeing), tennis and weightlifting in 2021.

Notes
Numbers in parentheses indicate the number of medal events that will be contested in each sport, where known.

Participating nations
As of 1 June 2022, twenty countries and territories have confirmed their participation in the games.

Medal table
The final medal tally of the 2022 Pacific Mini Games.

Calendar
The following table provides a summary of the competition schedule.

References

External links

 
Pacific Games by year
Pacific Games
Pacific Games
Pacific Mini Games
2022 in Northern Mariana Islands sports
International sports competitions hosted by the Northern Mariana Islands